Click is a Philippine television drama series broadcast by GMA Network. Directed by Mac Alejandre, it stars Richard Gutierrez, Alessandra de Rossi, Angel Locsin, Jake Cuenca, Karen delos Reyes, JC de Vera, Iya Villania and Chynna Ortaleza. It premiered on December 4, 1999 replacing T.G.I.S. The series concluded on July 24, 2004 with a total of 248 episodes.

The series is streaming online on YouTube.

Cast and characters

Main cast

 Maybelyn dela Cruz as Rosario "Rose" Mercado (1999–2002)
 Biboy Ramirez as Christian Dean Lacson (1999–2002)
 Tricia Roman as Isabella "Issa" Pascual (1999–2004)
 Joseph Izon as Nicholas "Nikko" Mercado (1999–2000)
 Trina Zuñiga as Melanie “Melai” Santos (1999–2001)
 Roxanne Barcelo as Antoinette “Toni” Darden (1999–2002)
 Danilo Barrios as Francisco “Popoy” Musngi (1999–2000)
 Erwin Aquino as Paolo Rosales (1999–2000)
 Jason Red as Medwin Rosales (1999–2000)
 James Blanco as Antonio Precioso “Anton” Relucio (2000–2002)
 Angelika dela Cruz as Olivia “Ollie” San Gabriel (2000)
 Wowie de Guzman as Hector (2000–2001)
 Wendell Ramos as Benedict "Ben" Santillan (2000–2001)
 Antoinette Taus as Alicia "Allie" Mendoza (2000)
 Alessandra De Rossi as Vivian “Ian” Rufino (2000–2003)
 Miko Sotto as Joselito "Joey" Mendoza (2000–2002)
 Sherwin Ordoñez as Jose Basilio "JB" Montelibano (2000–2003)
 Danica Sotto as Maria Carina "Kara" Rodriguez (2000–2003)
 Cogie Domingo as Giovanni "Gio" Santillan (2000–2001)
 Chynna Ortaleza as Michaela "Mimi" Mendez (2001–2003)
 Miles Poblete as Dang Dingle (2001–2002)
 Richard Gutierrez as Lorenzo "Enzo" Francisco (2002–2003)
 Angel Locsin as Charlotte Anne "Charley" Francisco (2002–2004)
 Railey Valeroso as Frederico "Icko" Ocampo (2002–2004)
 Brian Revilla as Emilio "Emil" (2002–2004)
 AJ Eigenmann as Joshua "Josh" Mendez (2002–2004)
 Karen delos Reyes as Rowena "Weng"/"Weena" Abergas (2002–2004)
 Dyan Delfin as Annabelle "Belle" Castillo (2002–2003)
 Jake Cuenca as Tryke (2003–2004)
 Iya Villania as Sydney Torres (2003–2004)
 Drew Arellano as Gilbert (2003–2004)
 Valerie Concepcion as Yasmin (2003–2004)
 Charina Scott as Destiny "Desi" (2003–2004)
 Denise Laurel as Beatriz (2003–2004)
 Jolo Revilla as Joma (2003–2004)
 JC de Vera as Benjamin "Benj" (2003–2004)
 Mikel Campos as Nathan (2003–2004)
 Lester Llansang as Buj (2003–2004)
 Crystal Moreno as Claudine (2003–2004)
 Jennylyn Mercado as Caroline (2004)
 Mark Herras as Miguel "Migs" (2004)
 Rainier Castillo as Gerard "Jerry" (2004)
 Yasmien Kurdi as Leilani (2004)
 Bianca King as Marnie (2004)
 Warren Austria as Lance (2004)

Recurring/guest cast

 Edward dela Cruz as Jet San Gabriel
 Joshua Diaz as Donjie Mallari
 Dexter Doria as Ma’am Rhoda Navarro
 Mel Kimura as the 3rd year high school adviser
 Nonie Buencamino as Arthur Lacson (Christian’s father)
 Irma Adlawan as Melai's mother
 Rayver Cruz as Mumoy
 Stella Canete as Christian’s mother
 Oliver Hartmann as Hans
 Sunshine Dizon
 Pia Wurtzbach as Frankie (2001)
 Dingdong Dantes 
 Joko Diaz
 Katarina Perez as Che (2001)  
 Jet Alcantara as William Francis "Francis" Victorino (2001) 
 Russel Mon as Vito (2001)
 J4 Zabale as Karl (2001)
 Aiza Marquez as Annaliza “Aiza” Atanacio (2001)
 Tiya Pusit as Che’s mother
 Gloria Diaz as Mamu Milagros "Aos" Rufino (2001–2003)
 Mel Martinez as the PE teacher
 Jackie Castillejo as Issa’s mother
 Mandy Ochoa as Enrico Pascual (Issa's father)
 Matet de Leon as Desiree
 Dino Guevara as Arguelles
 Richard Quan
 Gabby Eigenmann as Mark Cabrera
 Serena Dalrymple (2002)
 Polo Ravales as Joseph (2002)
 Coco Martin as Wesley "Yumyum" Cariño
 Anne Curtis (2002)
 Glaiza de Castro (2002)
 Mickey Ferriols as Sweet (Icko's mother)
 Bong Revilla (2002)
 Gladys Reyes
 Vanna Garcia (2003)

Accolades

References

External links
 
 

1999 Philippine television series debuts
2004 Philippine television series endings
Filipino-language television shows
GMA Network drama series
Philippine teen drama television series
Television shows set in the Philippines